Henri Cochet defeated the defending champion Jean Borotra in the final, 4–6, 4–6, 6–3, 6–4, 7–5 to win the gentlemen's singles tennis title at the 1927 Wimbledon Championships. Cochet became the first player to win three consecutive Grand Slam matches from two sets down, a record that was not matched until Tommy Robredo did the same at the French Open in 2013.

Sidney Wood became the youngest competitor in the men's singles at Wimbledon at 15 years 231 days when he was defeated by René Lacoste in the first round. George Greville has been the oldest singles player in Wimbledon history, was aged 59 when he lost in the first round of the tournament.

Seeds

  René Lacoste (semifinals)
  Bill Tilden (semifinals)
  Jean Borotra (final)
  Henri Cochet (champion)
  Takeichi Harada (first round)
  Louis Raymond (second round)
  Jacques Brugnon (quarterfinals)
  Jan Koželuh (quarterfinals)

Draw

Finals

Top half

Section 1

Section 2

Section 3

Section 4

Bottom half

Section 5

Section 6

Section 7

Section 8

References

External links

Men's Singles
Wimbledon Championship by year – Men's singles